Ajumako-Enyan-Essiam is one of the constituencies represented in the Parliament of Ghana. It elects one Member of Parliament (MP) by the first past the post system of election. Ajumako-Enyam-Essiam is located in the Ajumako/Enyan/Essiam district of the Central Region of Ghana.

Boundaries
The seat is located entirely within the Ajumako/Enyan/Essiam district of the Central Region of Ghana.

Members of Parliament

Elections

See also
List of Ghana Parliament constituencies
Ajumako/Enyan/Essiam District

References 

Parliamentary constituencies in the Central Region (Ghana)